IA16 may refer to:

 Iowa Highway 16
 Intel's 16-bit x86 processor architecture (a retronym)